The 2020–21 Columbus Blue Jackets season was the 21st season for the National Hockey League franchise that was established on June 25, 1997. On December 20, 2020, the league temporarily realigned into four divisions with no conferences due to the COVID-19 pandemic and the ongoing closure of the Canada-United States border. As a result of this realignment the Blue Jackets played this season in the Central Division and only played games against the other teams in their new division during the regular season.

On April 22, the Blue Jackets were eliminated from playoff contention for the first time since the 2015–16 season, after a 3–1 loss to the Tampa Bay Lightning.

Standings

Schedule and results

Regular season
The regular season schedule was published on December 23, 2020.

Notes

References

Columbus Blue Jackets

Columbus Blue Jackets seasons
Blue
Blue